Erik Grönwall is the debut studio album by hard rock vocalist Erik Grönwall, winner of the Swedish singing television competition Idol 2009. The release is a cover album of various different pop and rock artists that have inspired Grönwall. He followed the album up with 2010's Somewhere Between a Rock and a Hard Place. Erik Grönwall entered the Swedish Albums Chart at number one, staying there for four weeks. The album received generally negative reviews from Swedish music critics, but was a commercial success, becoming certified Platinum in Sweden with at least 40,000 copies sold.

Track listing

Charts and certifications

Weekly charts

Year-end charts

Release history

References

2009 debut albums